The 21st Game Developers Choice Awards was an annual awards ceremony by Game Developers Choice Awards for outstanding game developers and video games held on July 21, 2021. The awards ceremony was held alongside the Independent Games Festival awards, with both events presented through virtual streaming video due to the ongoing COVID-19 pandemic. Hades was named as Game of the Year.

Winners and nominees
Nominees were announced on April 20, 2021 Winners (noted in bold below) were named on July 21, 2021.

Game of the Year
 Hades (Supergiant Games)
 Animal Crossing: New Horizons (Nintendo EPD/Nintendo)
 Half-Life: Alyx (Valve)
 Ghost of Tsushima (Sucker Punch Productions/Sony Interactive Entertainment)
 The Last of Us Part II (Naughty Dog/Sony Interactive Entertainment)

Best Audio
 Hades (Supergiant Games)
 Doom Eternal (id Software/Bethesda Softworks)
 Final Fantasy 7 Remake (Square Enix)
 Ghost of Tsushima (Sucker Punch Productions/Sony Interactive Entertainment)
 The Last of Us Part II (Naughty Dog/Sony Interactive Entertainment)

Best Debut Developer
 Phasmophobia (Kinetic Games)
 Carrion (Phobia Game Studio/Devolver Digital)
 Mortal Shell (Cold Symmetry / Playstack)
 Raji: An Ancient Epic (Nodding Heads Games / Super!Com)
 Umurangi Generation (Origame Digital / Playism, Origame Digital)

Best Design
 Hades (Supergiant Games)
 Animal Crossing: New Horizons (Nintendo EPD/Nintendo)
 Half-Life: Alyx (Valve)
 Ghost of Tsushima (Sucker Punch Productions/Sony Interactive Entertainment)
 The Last of Us Part II (Naughty Dog/Sony Interactive Entertainment)

Best Mobile Game
 Genshin Impact (miHoYo)
 Alba: A Wildlife Adventure (ustwo/PID Publishing)
 If Found... (Dreamfeel/Annapurna Interactive)
 Legends of Runeterra (Riot Games)
 The Pathless (Giant Squid/Annapurna Interactive)

Innovation Award
 Dreams (Media Molecule/Sony Interactive Entertainment)
 Fall Guys: Ultimate Knockout (Mediatonic/Devolver Digital)
 Hades (Supergiant Games)
 Half-Life: Alyx (Valve)
 Microsoft Flight Simulator (Asobo Studio/Xbox Game Studios)

Best Narrative
 The Last of Us Part II (Naughty Dog/Sony Interactive Entertainment)
 Final Fantasy 7 Remake (Square Enix)
 Ghost of Tsushima (Sucker Punch Productions/Sony Interactive Entertainment)
 Hades (Supergiant Games)
 Kentucky Route Zero: TV Edition (Cardboard Computer/Annapurna Interactive)

Best Technology
 Microsoft Flight Simulator (Asobo Studio/Xbox Game Studios)
 Dreams (Media Molecule/Sony Interactive Entertainment)
 Ghost of Tsushima (Sucker Punch Productions/Sony Interactive Entertainment)
 Half-Life: Alyx (Valve)
 The Last of Us Part II (Naughty Dog/Sony Interactive Entertainment)

Best Visual Art
 Ghost of Tsushima (Sucker Punch Productions/Sony Interactive Entertainment)
 Cyberpunk 2077 (CD Projekt RED/CD Projekt)
 Hades (Supergiant Games)
 The Last of Us Part II (Naughty Dog/Sony Interactive Entertainment)
 Ori and the Will of the Wisps (Moon Studios/Xbox Game Studios/iam8bit)

Best VR/AR Game
 Half-Life: Alyx (Valve)
 Dreams (Media Molecule/Sony Interactive Entertainment)
 Paper Beast (Pixel Reef)
 Star Wars: Squadrons (Motive Studios/Electronic Arts)
 The Walking Dead: Saints & Sinners (Skydance Interactive)

Audience Award
 Ghost of Tsushima – Sucker Punch Productions

Pioneer Award
 Tom Fulp, creator of Newgrounds and co-founder of The Behemoth

Lifetime Achievement Award
 Laralyn McWilliams, director of Free Realms and Full Spectrum Warrior

External links
Official website

References

2021 awards in the United States
2021 in video gaming
2021 video game awards
Game Developers Choice Awards ceremonies
July 2021 events in the United States